National Union of Rail, Maritime and Transport Workers v United Kingdom [2014] ECHR 366 is a UK labour law case, concerning collective action and the right to take secondary action under ECHR article 11. It held that UK restrictions cannot be questioned on human rights grounds.

Facts
The National Union of Rail, Maritime and Transport Workers (RMT) claimed that it should be able to conduct strike action across a company group owned called Jarvis Group plc, although its members were specifically in dispute with a separate one of its subsidiaries, named Fastline Ltd, and a transferee of its employees, Hydrex. Fastline Ltd was part of the Jarvis plc group. This also included Jarvis Rail Ltd, which did rail engineering. Together the two subsidiaries had 1200 staff, and 569 were RMT members. In August 2007, Fastline transferred 20 employees to Hydrex Equipment (UK) Ltd with terms preserved under TUPER 2006, though other Hydrex workers were paid less and unions had less influence there. In March 2009, Hydrex stated that it intended to make the transferred employees’ terms the same as others, due to difficult market conditions, reducing salary by 36-40%. RMT organised a strike ballot among the 17 workers, who voted in favour on 6 to 9 November. They organised pickets on sites where they worked. The employer warned this was unlawful, not near an employer's premises. A second strike on 18–20 November was postponed when Hydrex said it would talk. Nine votes cast rejected a new offer, but a strike was ineffective against Hydrex, and RMT wished to organise a larger strike across the company: Jarvis employees would have supported the strike. Both Jarvis and Hydrex were put into administration in March 2010 and November 2011. Hydrex was bought by another company, sold on again in November 2012.

EDF Energy Powerlink Ltd operated electric power on the Underground, with RMT recognised, and 270 staff at three sites, Tufnell Park with 155: 52 RMT members among them. The company should not have known which were union members because it did not deduct union subscriptions from staff wages. RMT called a strike after June 2009 negotiations on pay and terms failed, and gave the ballot notice on 24 September, describing the worker category as ‘Engineer/Technician’. The day after, the company wrote saying it did not recognise the ‘technician’ category, saying that the notice did not therefore fulfil the statutory requirements. RMT said it had. The company filed for an injunction, granted by Blake J on 23 October 2009. During permission for appeals by 26 January 2010, the dispute was resolved, after RMT got job descriptions and gave notice of a new ballot in support.

Judgment
The European Court of Human Rights held that a ban on secondary action pursued a legitimate aim, in seeking to protect the rights of others. It was justified in pursuit of that aim because the interference with freedom of association was not far reaching in light of the wide margin of appreciation. It was true that the UK's absolute prohibition was at the extreme end of one spectrum, among a small number of European countries, but it could not be found to be disproportionate.

See also

UK labour law

Notes

References
E McGaughey, A Casebook on Labour Law (Hart 2018) ch 10, 430

United Kingdom labour case law
United Kingdom constitutional case law